2013 J.League Cup Final was the 21st final of the J.League Cup competition. The final was played at National Stadium in Tokyo on November 2, 2013. Kashiwa Reysol won the championship.

Match details

See also
2013 J.League Cup

References

J.League Cup
2013 in Japanese football
Kashiwa Reysol matches
Urawa Red Diamonds matches